Pamela Peck Wan-kam (born on September 1, 1944) was a Hong Kong radio agony aunt and celebrity and is a former member of Wan Chai District Council. Since 1989 she has been the partner of 'celebrity' lawyer and legislator Paul Tse.

Early life
Peck came to Hong Kong from China when she was three months old. Her dad died and her mother could not support her, so she went to live with her mother's sister, accompanied by her wet nurse.

She says that her uncle was 'dissolute' and would often bring girlfriends home. But her aunt befriended them so that they left.

Peck was seen by social welfare officers.  At around age 15, she ran away with a boyfriend, missing her HKCEE exams.

Career
She became a flight attendant and hosted radio programmes when not flying. She went back to school, and later studied TV broadcasting at the graduate school of San Francisco State University.

The public named her as 白小姐 or 白姐姐 during the launch of her phone-in radio talk show Heart To Heart (盡訴心中情) in 1986.  

Later, on her radio show Talk of the Town people discussed their love lives on air, on which she gave typically pithy but practical advice.

Apart from her talk show, Peck is an author; she writes columns periodically in various Hong Kong magazines and newspapers. The articles were later collected into books.

Conviction and imprisonment for tax evasion
On 19 April 2001, Peck was convicted of tax fraud and sentenced to three months in prison.  She had forged meal receipts and employee salary records to evade $210,000 in taxes.

She pled guilty to four counts of assisting Platinum Promotion Ltd with intent to evade tax between 1994 and 1998 – effectively four taxation years – by signing fraudulent returns. She held 99.9 per cent of the shares in the company.

Peck served her sentence at Tai Lam Centre for Women. While serving her sentence, she was not allowed to contribute to any of the publications for which she wrote columns.

Since the mid-1990s she has been the partner of prominent lawyer and legislator Paul Tse.  Tse is also her legal representative.

Filmography

References

Living people
1944 births
Hong Kong radio presenters
Hong Kong women radio presenters
Hong Kong columnists
Hong Kong women columnists
Advice columnists
District councillors of Wan Chai District
Hui actresses
Hong Kong people of Hui descent